Garth Risk Hallberg (born November 1978) is an American author. His debut novel is City on Fire.

Hallberg was born outside Baton Rouge, Louisiana and grew up in Greenville, North Carolina. In 2001 he received a degree in English from Washington University in St. Louis, where he met Elise White, his future wife. She graduated from Washington University in 2000 with degrees in English and African-American studies. Both of Hallberg's parents were teachers; his father was also a writer. They divorced when Hallberg was 13.

Hallberg resides in New York City. He published his first novel, City on Fire, in 2015, to criticism and acclaim. His work has also been published in The Millions.

Bibliography
A Field Guide to the North American Family (2007)
 City on Fire (2015)

References

Further reading 

 

1978 births
Living people
21st-century American novelists
Novelists from North Carolina
People from Greenville, North Carolina
Writers from Baton Rouge, Louisiana
American male novelists
Washington University in St. Louis alumni
Novelists from Louisiana
21st-century American male writers